Morris Air was a low-fare airline in the western United States, based in Salt Lake City, Utah. It began scheduled operations in 1992, and was sold to Southwest Airlines in December 1993 for over $120 million in stock. The airline officially became part of Southwest in the autumn of 1994. Morris Air was the first airline in the world to invent e-ticket (ticketless) travel based on the suggestion of Stuart Thatcher, an employee at the time. Although Southwest Airlines is often credited with offering the first e-ticketing system, it was in fact created and implemented by Morris Air and later integrated into Southwest Airlines after it purchased Morris Air.

History  

The airline began charter operations as Morris Air Service in 1984. It was launched by Utah businesswoman June Morris, who also founded Morris Travel in 1970, and David Neeleman who also co-founded WestJet and JetBlue. Neeleman worked with Southwest for a short period and when his non-compete agreement expired, he founded JetBlue Airways. June Morris sat on the board of directors of Southwest Airlines until she retired at the annual shareholders' meeting on May 17, 2006.

Charter flights were operated by Ryan International Airlines during 1992, and by both Ryan International and Sierra Pacific Airlines with some flights being operated with Boeing 737-200 jets before 1992.

Morris obtained its own FAR 121 operating certificate in December 1992 and then began operating as its own carrier.

The airline was based at Salt Lake City International Airport where it operated a hub and flew many routes primarily in the western U.S. using Boeing 737-300 aircraft. In late 1993, it operated over 1,000 flights per week with a fleet of 21 planes.

Destinations 

The following destination information is taken from Morris Air route maps with the airline not serving all of these airports at the same time.

 Boise Airport
 Colorado Springs Airport
 Denver Stapleton International Airport
 Eugene Airport
 Fresno Yosemite International Airport
 Laughlin/Bullhead International Airport
 Las Vegas McCarran International Airport
 Los Angeles International Airport
 Oakland International Airport
 Ontario International Airport
 Palm Springs Airport
 Phoenix Sky Harbor International Airport
 Portland International Airport
 Reno/Tahoe International Airport
 Sacramento International Airport
 Salt Lake City International Airport
 San Diego International Airport
 San Jose International Airport
 Santa Ana-John Wayne Airport
 Seattle-Tacoma International Airport
 Spokane International Airport
 Ted Stevens Anchorage International Airport
 Tucson International Airport
 Twin Falls, Idaho-Magic Valley Regional Airport

Morris Air Service Seasonal Destinations  

 Cancun International Airport
 Honolulu International Airportflights to and from Hawaii operated on behalf of Morris Air by American Trans Air (ATA)
 Los Cabos International Airport (Cabo San Lucas, Mexico)
 Mazatlan International Airport
 Orlando International Airport
 Playa de Oro International Airport (Manzanillo, Mexico)
 Puerto Vallarta International Airport

Fleet

21 - Boeing 737-300

See also 

 List of defunct airlines of the United States

References

External links 

AirTimes: Morris Air
Codes and Fleet Information

Defunct airlines of the United States
Airlines established in 1984
Airlines disestablished in 1994
Private equity portfolio companies
Southwest Airlines
1984 establishments in Utah
1994 disestablishments in Utah